Pismire Island is a small island in Lake Michigan of approximately  in size.  It is part of the Beaver Island archipelago, the Michigan Islands National Wildlife Refuge, and the Michigan Islands Wilderness Area.  It is managed by the U.S. Fish and Wildlife Service as a satellite of the Seney National Wildlife Refuge. It is located in St. James Township, Charlevoix County, Michigan.

It contains almost no permanent vegetation and is best known as a breeding place for Lake Michigan birds. The island was preserved for public use as part of the creation of the Michigan Islands NWR in 1943, and was designated as wilderness in 1970.

The word pismire means ant, referring to the island's tiny size.

References

Protected areas of Charlevoix County, Michigan
Islands of Lake Michigan in Michigan
Uninhabited islands of Michigan
Islands of Charlevoix County, Michigan